Kanchan Kamble (born 1 August 1970) is the former mayor of the Sangli-Miraj & Kupwad municipal corporation.

Present positions 
 Mayor, Sangli-Miraj & Kupwad city municipal corporation

References

 http://news.webindia123.com/news/articles/india/20130814/2239451.html
 http://divyamarathi.bhaskar.com/news/MAH-WMAH-KOL-kanchan-kamble-new-mayor-of-sangali-4348196-NOR.html
 http://www.loksatta.com/vruthanta-news/kanchan-kamble-mayor-of-sangli-174113/
 http://www.thehindu.com/todays-paper/tp-national/tp-karnataka/congress-defeats-ncp-at-sangli/article5027944.ece
 https://www.youtube.com/watch?v=BuRnGcoSx_w

External links
 http://www.aiilsg.org/wp-content/uploads/2015/03/Urban-vision-August-Sep-2014-new-last.pdf

Mayors of places in Maharashtra
Mayors of Sangli 
1970 births
Living people
Marathi politicians
Maharashtra local politicians